This is a list of communications and reconnaissance equipment in use with the British Army (and in some cases, shared with other branches of the British Armed Forces). For more equipment in use with the British Army, see Modern equipment of the British Army.

Bowman

Bowman is the tactical C4I system in service with British forces, replacing the Clansman system introduced in the 1970s. Designed to provide an integrated digital communications network interfacing with higher level systems and networks such as ISDN, Skynet V, Cormorant and FALCON. Commanders at all levels are given secure voice and data communications as well as an integrated Global Positioning System.

GEOINT
A deployable geospatial intelligence unit, this allows for situational awareness on a wide scale. With GEOINT exploitation and map production capabilities from strategic to tactical levels, it can update frontline troops with digital map updates for cohesive intelligence across the entire battlefront. Mounted on MOWAG Duro II trucks, the British Army has taken delivery of 11 GEOINT Stations with 3 vehicle-mounted tactical distribution systems.

HALO ASP Mk2
HALO is a sound ranging artillery detection designed to acoustically detect and track the direction and distance of enemy artillery launches out to 10 km and pass the information directly to a command post for counter-artillery fire to be immediately coordinated. The UK possesses only one unit, for specialist use in areas where UAVs might be unable to perform this role normally. It is held with 5th Regiment Royal Artillery.

MSTAR
MSTAR is a lightweight all-weather battlefield radar designed to detect helicopters, vehicles and infantry to a range in excess of 20 km. MSTAR is used by artillery Observation Parties (OPs) to detect where artillery shells are landing in relation to the target. It weighs 30 kg and is either stand alone or mounted in a vehicle. There are currently 200 in service.

COBRA
Cobra (Counter-battery Radar) is a 3D phased-array radar used for extremely long range artillery detection and location. Capable of tracking multiple barrage locations at one time, it has been designed to cope with saturation bombardment situations and provide locations of enemy artillery launches at extreme ranges for the GMLRS units of the Royal Artillery. There are currently 9 in service in 3 troops with 5th Regiment Royal Artillery.

BMETS
BMETS is a battlefield meteorological system that came into service to replace AMETS in 1999. It helps track enemy artillery locations by providing information on wind, atmospheric pressure, relative humidity and air density at various atmospheric levels from 90 m below to 4 km above sea level by releasing hydrogen filled balloons to detect and transmit information for counter-battery formula by allied units. Currently, there are six units consisting of two vehicles each in service, although only five are deployed in peacetime.

Surveillance System and Range Finder

This system  allows a soldier to quickly establish the location and distance of enemy forces and gives the soldier advice as to the most appropriate mortar or artillery firepower to use in response. The system is all-weather, day and night system has built-in GPS. 707 have been purchased for use, with deliveries complete in 2011, ahead of schedule.

ADAD
ADAD (Air Defence Alert System) is an infra-red thermal imaging surveillance system to detect close air targets such as jets or helicopters and direct air defence weapons on target. Built by Thorn EMI, it can track four targets at once and prioritise them in specific orders of threat for engagement, day and night.

Odette
The Odette system provides an electronic support measures (ESM) dimension within the overall electronic warfare capability; operating from both armoured and Land Rover borne variants, Odette electronically finds radio targets.

Scarus
SCARUS is an Electronic Support Measure (ESM) system that can be both man portable (WROTE) and vehicle borne (SEER) for electronic warfare.

The Large variant can be transported by C-17 Globemaster III and the Medium and RM variants by Hercules.

Joint Operational Command System
The JOCS provides digitised tools for controlling joint operations. With the formation of the Joint Rapid Reaction Force the requirement for a joint computer system was formed. This system provides a sophisticated operational picture, along with staff tools for controlling joint operations.

Army Tactical Computer System
The Army Tactical Computer System (ATacCS) provides the Army with a LAN and WAN based command and control system across the battlespace.

Falcon Secure Trunk Communication System
The Falcon Secure Trunk Communication System provides secure meshed communications infrastructure based on the Internet protocol suite for deployed formations and operating bases. It helps to deliver an information infrastructure that will provide the UK Armed Forces with the network enabled capability required in the 21st century. It is designed to operate with other communication and information systems such as Bowman, Cormorant and Skynet 5, and will be compatible with other NATO systems. The system provides the telephones and data distribution when deployed. Procurement started about 2005, with an intention to enter service in 2009. Testing and field trials were completed in 2012, with delivery through to mid-2013.

Defence Information Infrastructure
Defence Information Infrastructure (DII(F)) is one of the largest information infrastructure programmes in Europe. It will provide a computing infrastructure and services that will enable sharing of information and collaborative working to a variety of groups and individuals including those that currently have limited or no connectivity. Ultimately it will provide around 300,000 user accounts on approximately 150,000 terminals across about 2,000 MoD sites worldwide. DII will be central to transforming the capability of the Armed Forces by providing Network Enabled Capability through a single network of information. It will extend into the operational arena, interface with battlespace systems and improve shared information between headquarters, battlefield support and the front line, allowing greater interoperability between the MoD and its allies.

DII is being delivered in Increments. Increment 1 will provide DII(F) to around 70,000 desktops and 200,000 user accounts. Increment 2 looks at Deployed services and services to the Above Secret environment. The service ranges geographically from the office environment in headquarters to forward deployed units anywhere in the world.

MegaVoice
STG Media Systems has delivered 87 of the loudspeaker systems to Afghanistan for use at checkpoints and at public gatherings The ability to hear intelligible speech at 1 km allows the user to distance themselves  from danger and warn the public about imminent actions being taken by, for example, IED clearance teams.

Cormorant
The Cormorant system is a deployable communications network for the Joint Task Force Headquarters. It provides communications support for direct users at Joint Force and other deployed Command Headquarters. The system offers worldwide deployability and is an integral part of the broader Global Information Infrastructure concept.

Computer networks
 OVERTASK - On Operation HERRICK (Afghanistan), the OVERTASK network is used for strategic through to the tactical levels of command. This supports applications that deliver situational awareness, office tools and collaborative working.
 ARRC C2IS - As well as the core networks the HQ ARRC now has its own ARRC Command and Control Information System (ARRC C2IS) to provide a Battle Management System and office automation.
 J1/J4 IOS - In addition to OVERTASK, the J1/J4 Interim Operational Support (J1/J4 IOS) system is still in operation in Afghanistan but now serves significantly more users than it was originally designed for. J1/J4 IOS supports Restricted information transfer and applications such as Joint Personal Administration.

Satellite communications

Skynet (Satellite network)

Skynet is a family of military satellites, which provide strategic communication services to the three branches of the British Armed Forces and to NATO forces engaged in coalition tasks.

In 2013, new types of Skynet terminals were delivered, utilising Skynet's new Internet Protocol (IP) based modular infrastructure. Vislink Mantis terminals and Snapper baseband equipment for land forces, SCOTPatrol terminals for small vessels, and transportable IP Domain nodes for large land forces or air bases. In 2020 further units were purchased along with Vislink NewSwift ground terminals.

Small SATCOM

Small SATCOM capability consists of a SWE-DISH CCT-120 satellite ground terminal owned by Paradigm Secure Communications. The ground terminal uses the Skynet 5 network. This provides a service to users on operations worldwide. The satellite ground terminal is lightweight, easily air transportable  and can be set up by a single trained operator in less than 30 minutes.

Reacher Satellite Ground Terminal
Reacher is a mobile X-Band Satellite Ground Terminal (SGT) providing services through Skynet 5 satellites.
It comes in three variants:
Reacher Large, mounted on a MOWAG Duro III
Reacher Medium, mounted on a MOWAG Duro III
Reacher RM, mounted on a BV206 vehicles (2 in service for use by the Royal Marines)

FAST welfare cabin
For welfare purposes, the FAST (flexible, agile, scalable and transportable) welfare cabins, housed in converted ISO shipping containers, provide telephones, internet workstations, video messaging, wi-fi and a satcom terminal primarily for military staff on operations to stay in contact with their families.

See also
Modern equipment of the British Army

References

British Army equipment
British Army
Military communications of the United Kingdom